Martin Atkins (born 24 December 1965) is an English professional darts player. His nickname is The Assassin.

Career

Atkins has been a Yorkshire county player since 1996 and has represented the England national side in many occasions including 3 times in the Six Nations, winning all three, and once in the World Cup in 2011, contributing to England's best performance since 1995. He reached the last 16 of the BDO World Professional Darts Championship in both 2006 and 2007. In 2006 he led Martin Adams 3–0 and had a match dart in the fifth leg of the fifth set, but ultimately lost 4–3. The following year, he was beaten by eventual finalist Phill Nixon.

He was seeded number 10 for the 2008 BDO World Darts Championship. However, he lost in the first round to Andy Boulton. The following year, unseeded, Atkins won his first round match 3–2 against Joey ten Berge before losing to Gary Robson 4–1.

Seeded number 10 for the 2010 BDO World Darts Championship, Atkins suffered another first round exit after he was defeated by Lakeside debutant Paul Carter 3–1. In 2011, Atkins was drawn against third seed and eventual runner-up Dean Winstanley in the first round, and lost 3–2 having missed two match darts in the fourth set.

Atkins finally progressed past the second-round stage of the World Championship when, in 2012, he defeated 7th seed John Walton and 10th seed Willy van de Wiel en route to a quarter-final match against Ted Hankey where he lost 5–1. In 2012, Atkins won the biggest title of his career so far by winning the BDO British Open, beating Robbie Green in the final. However, his season ended in disappointment when he lost in the first round of the World Championship to Jason Cullen.

Atkins was unseeded for the 2014 World Championship and faced eighth seed Jeffrey de Graaf in the first round. Despite competing with an elbow injury sustained on New Year's Day, and despite de Graaf throwing for two of the sets, Atkins won the match 3–0, finishing with a 135 checkout on the bullseye. However, Atkins had to withdraw during his second round match against Rick Hofstra while trailing 2–0 in sets.

PDC
Announced on 9 December 2017, he will be joining the rival organisation the Professional Darts Corporation for the first time in his career. He has played most of the BDO tour but has decided to give the PDC tour a go for the first time after playing his whole career in the BDO.

BDO
As of May 2018, it would seem he returned to the BDO circuit due to an unsuccessful run on the PDC circuit.

World Championship results

BDO

 2005: 1st round (lost to Robert Thornton 0–3)
 2006: 2nd round (lost to Martin Adams 3–4)
 2007: 2nd round (lost to Phil Nixon 1–4)
 2008: 1st round (lost to Andy Boulton 2–3)
 2009: 2nd round (lost to Gary Robson 1–4)
 2010: 1st round (lost to Paul Carter 1–3)
 2011: 1st round (lost to Dean Winstanley 2–3)
 2012: Quarter-final (lost to Ted Hankey 1–5)
 2013: 1st round (lost to Jason Cullen 1–3)
 2014: 2nd round (withdrew while trailing Rick Hofstra 0–2)
 2016: 2nd round (lost to Richard Veenstra 0–4)
 2017: 1st round (lost to Jamie Hughes 1–3)

Performance timeline

References

External links
Official website
Profile and stats on Darts Database

English darts players
1965 births
Living people
British Darts Organisation players
Professional Darts Corporation associate players